Bobby Murdoch (25 January 1936 – 12 February 2017) was an English professional footballer who played as a striker.

Career
Murdoch began with South Liverpool, his local club, in 1952, making his debut in the Lancashire Combination second division aged 16. He signed for Liverpool on 11 May 1955 as an amateur and became a full professional in 1957. He made his Liverpool debut on Boxing Day 1957 and played 15 Football League division two matches in 1957–58. He played two League matches the season after before leaving Anfield in September 1959, two months before the arrival as manager of Bill Shankly. Murdoch later had spells with Bolton Wanderers, Barrow F.C., Stockport County, Carlisle United, Southport F.C., Wigan Athletic before he returned to South Liverpool in 1965. He became the South Liverpool player-manager, replacing Allen Hampson, in 1971 and remained at Holly Park until 1975–76.

After football
After leaving football in 1976, he ran a taxi cab firm in Liverpool before he moved to Cheshire in 1982. He lived in retirement just outside Chester.

Murdoch died on 12 February 2017, at the age of 81.

References

Sources
Post War English & Scottish Football League A - Z Player's Transfer Database profile
 LFC History profile

1936 births
2017 deaths
English footballers
Liverpool F.C. players
South Liverpool F.C. players
Footballers from Liverpool
Association football inside forwards
Barrow A.F.C. players
Stockport County F.C. players
Carlisle United F.C. players
Southport F.C. players
English Football League players